The Napier Nomad is a British diesel aircraft engine designed and built by Napier & Son in 1949. They combined a piston engine with a turbine to recover energy from the exhaust and thereby improve fuel economy. Two versions were tested, the complex Nomad I which used two propellers, each driven by the mechanically independent stages, and the Nomad II, using the turbo-compound principle, coupled the two parts to drive a single propeller. The Nomad II had the lowest specific fuel consumption figures seen up to that time. Despite this the Nomad project was cancelled in 1955 having spent £5.1 million on development, as most interest had passed to turboprop designs.

Design and development 

In 1945 the Air Ministry asked for proposals for a new  class engine with good fuel economy. Curtiss-Wright was designing an engine of this sort of power known as the turbo-compound engine, but Sir Harry Ricardo, one of Britain's great engine designers, suggested that the most economical combination would be a similar design using a diesel two-stroke in place of the Curtiss petrol engine.

Before World War II Napier had licensed the Junkers Jumo 204 diesel design to set up production in the UK as the Napier Culverin, but the onset of the war made the Sabre all-important and work on the Culverin was stopped. In response to the Air Ministry's 1945 requirements Napier dusted off this work, combining two enlarged Culverins into an H-block similar to the Sabre, resulting in a massive 75 litre design. Markets for an engine of this size seemed limited, however, so instead they reverted to the original Sabre-like horizontally opposed 12 cylinder design, and the result was the Nomad.

The objective of the design was to produce a civilian power plant with far superior fuel efficiency to the emerging jet engine. Jet engines have relatively low-temperature combustion systems which produce a T of no more than about 1,000 K, much less than the typical 5,000 K of a reciprocating engine, and so jets have very poor thermal efficiency. The Nomad design focused on replacing the low-temperature combustion chambers of the jet engine with highly efficient Diesel combustion chambers. In practice, it was much too difficult to couple the diesel power output back into the turbine cycle. By this time civilian jets such as the Boeing 707 were nearing completion, and the Nomad was never seriously considered by any aircraft manufacturer.

Nomad I

The initial Nomad design (E.125) or Nomad 1 was incredibly complex, almost two engines in one. One was a turbo-supercharged two-stroke diesel, having some resemblance to half of a Napier Sabre's H-24. Mounted below this were the rotating parts of a turboprop engine, based on the Naiad design, the output of which drove the front propeller of a contra-rotating pair. To achieve higher boost, the crankshaft drove a centrifugal supercharger, which also provided the scavenging needed for starting the engine from rest. During take-off additional fuel was injected into the rear turbine stage for more power, and turned off once the aircraft was cruising.

The compressor and turbine assemblies of the Nomad were tested during 1948, and the complete unit was run in October 1949. The prototype was installed in the nose of an Avro Lincoln heavy bomber for testing: it first flew in 1950 and appeared at the Farnborough Air Display on 10 September 1951. In total the Nomad I ran for just over 1,000 hours, and proved to be rather temperamental, but when running properly it could produce  and  thrust.

The prototype Nomad I is on display at the National Museum of Flight at East Fortune Airfield in Scotland.

Nomad II

 
Even before the Nomad I was running, its successor, the Nomad II (E.145) Nomad 6, had already been designed. In this version an extra stage was added to the axial compressor/supercharger, eliminating the separate centrifugal part and the intercooler. The turbine (which also received an additional stage) was now only used to drive the compressor, and feed back any excess power to the main shaft using a Beier variable-ratio gear; the separate propeller from the turbine was deleted, just as the whole of the "afterburner" system with its valves etc. So the system was now like a combination of a mechanical supercharger, and a turbocharger without any need for bypass. The result was smaller and considerably simpler: a single engine driving a single propeller. The wet liners of the cylinders of the Nomad I were changed for dry liners.

While the Nomad II was undergoing testing, a prototype Avro Shackleton was lent to Napier as a testbed. The engine proved bulky, like the Nomad I before it, and in the meantime several dummy engines were used on the Shackleton for various tests.

By 1954 interest in the Nomad was waning, and after the only project, the Avro Type 719 Shackleton IV, based on it was cancelled, work on the engine was ended in April 1955, after an expenditure of £5.1 million. The design was also considered for the Canadair Argus, a similar maritime patrol aircraft being designed for the Royal Canadian Air Force. This design turned to the Wright R-3350, the design the Nomad was intending to best.

A Nomad II is on display at the Steven F. Udvar-Hazy Center in Virginia.

Applications
 Airspeed Ambassador (planned only)
 Avro Lincoln (test bed only)
 Avro Shackleton (planned only)
 Canadair CP-107 Argus (planned only)

Specifications (Nomad II)

Turbine section

See also

References

https://www.thegrowler.org.uk/avroshackleton/the-nomad-proposal.htm – The Nomad Proposal, research by Chris Ashworth – it was amongst the original sources of the article according to the history

External links

Aircraft Engine Historical Society photo gallery of Napier piston engines

Nomad
Turbo-compound engines
Aircraft diesel engines
Flat engines
1940s turboprop engines
Two-stroke aircraft piston engines
1940s aircraft piston engines
Diesel engines by model
Diesel engines by maker
Avro Shackleton